Bobcat Hills are a ridge of hills in Greenlee County, Arizona.

References

Ridges of Arizona
Landforms of Greenlee County, Arizona